Horstmar is a German town, located in North Rhine-Westphalia in the Steinfurt district, approx.  north-west of Münster.

History
Its castle was built as early as the 9th century; the first mention of Horstmar is as early as the early 11th century. The city of Horstmar was built to the south of this castle. During the Thirty Years' War the castle was destroyed by order of the Hessian lieutenant Carl von Rabenhaupt.

Politics
The city council consists of 22 councillors and the mayor.

People from Horstmar 
 Clemens Freiherr von Schorlemer-Lieser (1856-1922), German politician

References

Towns in North Rhine-Westphalia
Steinfurt (district)